The 48th Newfoundland and Labrador House of Assembly was elected on November 30, 2015. Members of the House of Assembly were sworn in December 14, 2015. The Liberals under Dwight Ball had a majority government during this parliament which lasted until the 2019 provincial election.

Members

Seating plan

Standings changes in the 48th Assembly

References

47